Selim is a town and a district of Kars Province in the Eastern Anatolia region of Turkey. The population is 4,781 as of 2010. The mayor is Coşkun Altun (AKP).

References

Towns in Turkey
Populated places in Kars Province
 
Districts of Kars Province
Kurdish settlements in Turkey